A tiltwing aircraft features a wing that is horizontal for conventional forward flight and rotates up for vertical takeoff and landing. It is similar to the tiltrotor design where only the propeller and engine rotate. Tiltwing aircraft are typically fully capable of VTOL operations.

The tiltwing design offers certain advantages in vertical flight relative to a tiltrotor. Because the slipstream from the rotor strikes the wing on its smallest dimension, the tiltwing is able to apply more of its engine power to lifting the aircraft. For comparison, the V-22 Osprey tiltrotor loses about 10% of its thrust to interference from the wings. 

Another advantage of tiltwing aircraft is the ease of transition between VTOL and horizontal flight modes. A tiltrotor must first fly forwards like a helicopter, building airspeed until wing lift is sufficient to allow the nacelles to begin tilting down. Conversely, a tiltwing aircraft can begin the transition from helicopter to airplane at zero forward airspeed.

However, the fixed wing of a tiltrotor aircraft offers a superior angle of attack—thus more lift and a shorter takeoff roll—when performing STOL/STOVL operations. 

The main drawbacks of tiltwing aircraft are susceptibility to wind gusts in VTOL mode and lower hover efficiency. The wing tilted vertically represents a large surface area for crosswinds to push against. Tiltrotors generally have better hover efficiency than tiltwings, but less than helicopters.  This is due to the difference in rotor disk loading. 

As of 2014, NASA is testing a diesel-electric hybrid 10-foot 10-rotor tiltwing called the GL-10 Greased Lightning, with most propellers folding during horizontal flight.

List of tiltwing aircraft
Tiltwing designs with rocket, jet, or propeller propulsion

 Airbus A³ Vahana (2018)
 Canadair CL-84 Dynavert (1965)
 Hiller X-18 (1959)
 Kaman K-16B (1959)
 LTV XC-142 (1964)
 NASA GL-10 Greased Lightning (2014)
 Vertol VZ-2 (1957)
 Weserflug P.1003 (1938)

See also
 Thrust vectoring
 Tailsitter
 Tiltrotor
 Tiltjet
 Coleopter
 VTOL

References

Aircraft configurations